Marcel Lévesque (6 December 1877 – 16 February 1962) was a French film actor.

Born Joseph Marcel Lévesque in Paris, he died in Couilly-Pont-aux-Dames.

Selected filmography

 Les Vampires (1915)
 Judex (1916)
 La dama de Chez Maxim's (1923)
 Take Care of Amelia (1925)
 Floretta and Patapon (1927)
 All That's Not Worth Love (1931)
 Le Crime de Monsieur Lange (1936)
 Let's Make a Dream (1936)
 La Nuit fantastique (1942)
 Summer Light (1943)
 Majestic Hotel Cellars (1945)

External links

1877 births
1962 deaths
French male film actors
French male silent film actors
Male actors from Paris
20th-century French male actors